A85 or A-85 may refer to:

 Dutch Defence, in the Encyclopaedia of Chess Openings
 Gleaner A85, a combine harvester

Roads
 A85 road (Scotland)
 Quebec Autoroute 85, a Canadian highway part of the Trans-Canada Highway
 A85 motorway (France)

See also